The Polubotok Club Affair was an important national civil affair and an armed revolt of the Kiev garrison troops that took place on July 17–18, 1917 in Kiev soon after the collapse of the Kerensky Offensive (July 16). It was part of a Ukrainian military movement, one of key roles played by the public organization Ukrainian Military Club of Pavlo Polubotok.

The rebels’ main goal was an immediate proclamation of Ukrainian independence. The rebellion itself had several political and social reasons. Soldiers of the Cossack regiment deeply lacked food supplies and medicines, experienced poor living conditions. Among the political reasons were those that the Central Council of Ukraine obtained pale national and military policy. In whole, more than 10 thousand soldiers and most of the population of Kiev found themselves in the center of the revolt.

The uprising was later stifled due to the effective counter-actions of the Ukrainian officials and leaders of the Russian Kiev Military District. The participants of the revolt were mainly exiled to the Romanian World War I frontlines, where many soon died. The ideologist of the disorder is considered the contemporary nationalist leader of that time Mykola Mikhnovsky although there is no direct and clear evidences of his involvement in those events.

Causes and preceding events
Ukrainian military movement has rapidly developed after establishment of the Ukrainian military club in March 1917. It was closely cooperated with the clandestine Fraternity of Independentists led by Valentyn Otamanovsky.

Fraternity of Independentists and conspiracy
Ukrainian politician and researcher of the Ukrainian liberation movement from Horlivka, Roman Koval, points out the fact that on 27 June 1917 took place a conference of the clandestine Kiev organization Fraternity of Independentists where it discussed pacifistic policies of the Central Council of Ukraine. A discussion about the attempt of armed coup split. One urged to decisively replace the autonomy-seeking politicians with the military dictatorship headed by Hetman. Others claimed that it would bring a ruin in society and the coup should be directed exclusively against Russians. Koval also mentioned that in June 1917 Mykola Mikhnovsky joined the organization.

The commander of the First Ukrainian regiment Yuriy Kapkan, whom Mikhnovsky had intended to play an important role in the coup, disclosed Mikhnovsky's plans to Volodymyr Vynnychenko.

Russian government delegation

On 2 July 1917 a Russian government delegation headed by Alexander Kerensky visit Kiev after the declaration of the First Universal of Central Council that called for autonomous status of the Russian Southwestern Krai.

See also
 July Days, same timeframe in Saint Petersburg.

Notes

References

Further reading
 Soldatenko, V.F and Soldatenko, I.V. Strike of Polubotkivtsi in 1917. "Ukrainian Historical Magazine" ## 7 - 10. 1993.
 Soldatenko, V.F. Ukrainian Revolution. Historical overview: Monograph. "Lybid". Kiev 1999. .
 Doroshenko, D. History of Ukraine 1917-1923 in two volumes. "Tempora". Kiev 2002.
 Vynnychenko, V. Revival of nation: History of the Ukrainian Revolution (March 1917 - December 1919). Kiev 1990.
 Skoropadsky, P. Memoirs (end of 1917 - December 1918). "Kyiv - Filadelfia". Kiev 1995.
 Mikhnovsky, M.I. Sovereign Ukraine. "Diokor". Kiev 2002. .
 Milyukov, P.N. History of the Second Russian Revolution. Vol.1, Ed.2. Sofia 1992.
 Sidak, V., Ostashko, T., Vronska, T. Colonel Petro Bolbochan: Tragedy of a Ukrainian Statesman (Scientific edition). "Tempora". Kiev 2004. (Illustrations)
 Mirchuk, P. Revival of a Grand Idea. "Ukrainian Publishing Club". Kiev 1999.
 Historical Encyclopedia. 1917-2000. "3MEDIA". Kiev 2002.
 Ukraine Incognito / After a general editorship of Larysa Ivanyshyn. Ed.4 (stereotypical). "Ukrainian press-group, LLC". Kiev 2005.
 Koval, R. Crimson harvest of the Ukrainian Revolution. Kiev: Diokor, 2005.

External links
 Eternal oppositioner by Volodymyr Horak for Newspaper "Den" (April 14, 2007)
 The Apostle of the Ukrainian statehood at Government portal (Ukraine)
 Scarlet fields of the Ukrainian revolution by Roman Koval (Strike of Polubotkivtsi) at The Ukrainian Life at Sevastopol website

Russian Revolution in Ukraine
Rebellions in Ukraine
Riots and civil disorder in Russia
Russian Provisional Government
1917 in Ukraine
Conflicts in 1917
1910s in Kyiv
Political scandals in Ukraine
Ukrainian democracy movements
Ukrainian nationalism
Protests in Ukraine
Riots and civil disorder in Ukraine
July 1917 events